Bilua (also known as Mbilua or Vella Lavella) is the most populous Papuan language spoken in the Solomon Islands. It is a Central Solomon language spoken by about 9,000 people on the island of Vella Lavella. It is one of the four non-Austronesian languages spoken in the Solomon Islands.

Classification
"Bilua is sometimes grouped with the other Central Solomons languages and beyond (Wurm 1975b) but closer inspection shows that a genealogical relation is not demonstrable (Dunn and Terrill 2012, Terrill 2011)" (Hammarström, forthcoming).

Phonology
The consonant and vowels sounds of Bilua.

Consonants 

The voiced stops and affricate sounds /b d ɡ dʒ/ can occur as prenasalized allophones, when occurring intervocalically [ᵐb ⁿd ᵑɡ ⁿdʒ]. Other consonant allophones include [w tʃ] for /β dʒ/.

Vowels 

Four vowel sounds /i u e o/ have allophones but only in diphthongs as [ɪ ɛ ɔ ʊ].

Verb construction

Sample Verbs

Noun classification 
Bilua has a masculine-feminine gender system with no neuter nouns. Truly males are always male and truly female are always female.

Numerals

References

Further reading

External links 
 Paradisec open access collection of recordings of Bilua.
 Bilua words 1 - 209, two texts Word List Texts 1 - 11 Texts 12 - 20 Texts 21 - 27 Texts 28 - 39 Texts 40 - 49 Texts 50 - 62 Texts 64 - 66 Texts 67 - 68 Texts 69 - 72 Conversation
 The Endangered Language Project
 Bilua Grammar

Languages of the Solomon Islands
Central Solomon languages